Dobra Bridge is located between the Vrbovsko and Ravna Gora interchanges of the A6 motorway in Gorski Kotar, Croatia, spanning Dobra River. The bridge consists of two parallel structures, both completed in 2003 by Primorje. The bridge is tolled within the A6 motorway ticket system and there are no separate toll plazas associated with use of the bridge. The bridge is located in a water protection area.

Traffic volume
Traffic is regularly counted and reported by Autocesta Rijeka–Zagreb, operator of the viaduct and the A6 motorway where the structure is located, and published by Hrvatske ceste. Substantial variations between annual (AADT) and summer (ASDT) traffic volumes are attributed to the fact that the bridge carries substantial tourist traffic to the Adriatic resorts. The traffic count is performed using analysis of motorway toll ticket sales.

See also
List of bridges by length

References

Box girder bridges
Bridges completed in 2003
Toll bridges in Croatia
Buildings and structures in Primorje-Gorski Kotar County
Transport in Primorje-Gorski Kotar County